This is a list of airlines which have an air operator's certificate issued by the Civil Aviation Authority  of Argentina.

See also 
List of defunct airlines of Argentina
List of airlines

References 

 
Airlines
Argentina
Airlines
Argentina